Laut Ke Chalay Aana is a Pakistani family drama series, produced by Asif Noor and Dr.Huma. The drama airs weekly on Geo Entertainment every Wednesday. It is written by Shahzad Javed (Currently Assistant Vice President Content, HUM TV, Pakistan) It stars Noman Ijaz, Savera Nadeem, Minal Khan, Shermeen Ali and Arisha Razi in lead roles. Serial marks return of Savera Nadeem to small screen after short series of break. The show did not get that good TRPs in competition to Hum TV and ARY Digital in the same slot and was ended early.

Plot 
Not every marriage gets a happily ever after and so is the case with Zainab and Farhan. When Zainab embraces motherhood, she starts taking her role as a wife for granted whilst Farhan, too, becomes oblivious of his part as a husband.

Laut Ke Chalay Aana tackles the sensitive issue of incompatibility between married couples. Despite staying married for several years and having two grown-up daughters, the couple doesn’t realise when they lost the spark and grew distant. They hardly talk to each other and most of their interactions turn into arguments.

In one of those days, a young, modern working woman enters Ijaz’s life and makes him realize what’s missing. He is inclined towards her and eventually proposes her. With this, Zainab’s world throws her off balance.

Cast
Noman Ijaz as Farhan
Savera Nadeem as Zainab
Minal Khan as Khadija
Arisha Razi as Ayesha
Seemi Pasha as Shamim
Shermeen Ali as Abeera
Ahmed Zeb as Rizwan
Hajra Khan as Naseem
Tara Mahmood as Aqeela

References

2017 Pakistani television series debuts
Pakistani television series
Urdu-language television shows
Geo TV original programming